The Reel Me is an EP and music video compilation album by American singer and
actress Jennifer Lopez. It was released on November 18, 2003 by Epic Records, containing all her hits at the time and a series of singles released from the albums On the 6 (1999), J.Lo (2001), J to tha Lo! The Remixes (2002) and This Is Me... Then (2002) respectively. Some of the original singles were replaced as the remix versions such as Waiting for Tonight.

Track listings

Charts

Certifications

Release history

References 

2003 debut EPs
Jennifer Lopez albums
Albums with cover art by Tony Duran
Epic Records compilation albums
Epic Records remix albums
Epic Records video albums
2003 compilation albums
2003 remix albums
2003 video albums
Music video compilation albums
Albums produced by Cory Rooney
Hip hop soul compilation albums